The Law of the Tong is a 1931 American pre-Code crime film directed by Lewis D. Collins and starring Phyllis Barrington, John Harron and Jason Robards Sr.

Synopsis
A dance hall hostess becomes mixed up in a gang smuggling illegal immigrants into America.

Cast
 Phyllis Barrington as Joan 
 John Harron as Doug 
 Jason Robards Sr. as Charlie Wong 
 Frank Lackteen as Yuen Lee 
 Dot Farley as Madam Duval 
 Mary Carr as Mother McGregor 
 William Malan as Captain McGregor 
 Richard Alexander as Davy Jones 
 Wong Chung as Tong Member 
 Ben Corbett as First Drunk
 Olin Francis as Dance Hall Customer

References

Bibliography
 Michael R. Pitts. Poverty Row Studios, 1929–1940: An Illustrated History of 55 Independent Film Companies, with a Filmography for Each. McFarland & Company, 2005.

External links
 

1931 films
1931 crime films
1930s English-language films
American crime films
Films directed by Lewis D. Collins
1930s American films